The Rossland Miners were a senior men's ice hockey team from Rossland, British Columbia. The team played in the West Kootenay League for 12 years in the 1920s and 1930s.

The Miners won the league title and British Columbia Senior Championships in both 1924 and 1925.

Season-by-season results

West Kootenay League (1923-30)
 Season	Games	Won	Lost	Tied	Points	GoalsFor	GoalsAgainst	Standing	Playoffs	
 1923-24	7	5	2	0	10	23	15	1st	no playoffs, Won BC, Lost West Quarter Final	
 1924-25	8	4	4	0	8	-	-	Tied 1st	Won Final, Won BC, Lost West Semi Final	
 1925-26	8	4	4	0	8	21	18	2nd	Lost Final	
 1926-27	-	-	-	-	-	-	-	2nd	Lost Final	
 1927-28	12	2	9	1	5	24	58	3rd	out of playoffs	
 1928-29	12	5	6	1	11	31	35	2nd	Lost Final	
 1929-30	7	5	2	0	10	17	16	1st	Defaulted Final

West Kootenay League (1933-38)
 Season	Games	Won	Lost	Tied	Points 	GoalsFor	GoalsAgainst	Standing	Playoffs	
 1933-34	18	3	14	1	7	-	-	4th	out of playoffs	
 1934-35	16	2	14	0	4	25	89	3rd	Lost Semi Final	
 1935-36	-	-	-	-	-	-	-	4th	Lost Quarter Final	
 1936-37	14	3	10	1	.250	-	-	4th	out of playoffs	
 1937-38	24	4	19	1	9	80	174	3rd West	out of playoffs

References

Defunct ice hockey teams in Canada
Ice hockey teams in British Columbia
West Kootenay League